The Dictionary of Serbo-Croatian Literary and Vernacular Language (Речник српскохрватског књижевног и народног језика, Rečnik srpskohrvatskog književnog i narodnog jezika) or the Dictionary of the Serbian Academy of Sciences and Arts (Речник Српске академије наука и уметност, Rečnik Srpske akdemije nauka i umetnosti, or Rečnik SANU for short) is the official dictionary of the Serbo-Croatian language published by the Serbian Academy of Sciences and Arts. The publication of the Dictionary has started in 1959, and is ongoing. So far, 21 volumes have been published, with the latest, 21st volume, published in 2020 covering words starting with letter "p" (in order of the Cyrillic alphabet). About fifty more years are needed for the completion of the whole project. It is a historical dictionary whose entries are based on primary sources of actual usage in the last two centuries.

First 21 volumes contain around 250,000 entries, while the complete Dictionary is expected to have 40 volumes and around 500,000 entries. When completed, it will be one of the most comprehensive dictionaries in the World. By comparison, the Oxford English Dictionary has around 300,000, German Deutsches Wörterbuch has around 350,000, and Dutch Woordenboek der Nederlandsche Taal has about 430,000 entries.

The dictionary was initiated in 1888 by Stojan Novaković, a member of the Serbian Royal Academy, in the centenary commemoration of the birthday of Vuk Stefanović Karadžić. A sample volume was created by 1913, but further work on the dictionary was interrupted by the First World War, and later the Second World War, so conditions for steady work on it were realized after the founding of the Institute for the Serbian language in 1947. The publication of the Dictionary started in 1959, with a prominent Serbian linguist Aleksandar Belić as the editor-in-chief for the first volume, before he died in 1960. At the time, the official name of the language in Yugoslavia was "Serbo-Croatian". Since the break-up of Yugoslavia, the publication was continued by Serbia under the same name, despite the codification of its own "Serbian" language. It still contains and collects words from the whole area of Shtokavian dialects, i.e. words that now also belong to Croatian, Bosnian and Montenegrin standards. The publication of the Dictionary is mandated by the Serbia's Law on the Dictionary of the Serbian Academy of Sciences and Arts (2005).

See also
Srpski rječnik
List of Croatian dictionaries

References

Serbo-Croatian language
Serbo-Croatian dictionaries
Serbian Academy of Sciences and Arts